The Senior League World Series Australia Region is one of six International regions that currently sends teams to the World Series in Easley, South Carolina. The region's participation in the SLWS dates back to 2017.

Australia Region States

Region Champions
As of the 2022 Senior League World Series.

Australian National Championship - Championship games 

 This table includes championship games contested prior to Australia's automatic berth into the Little League World Series.

* Due to the continued impact of the COVID-19 pandemic no international teams traveled to Easley in 2021.

Results by State
As of the 2022 Senior League World Series.

See also
Australia Region in other Little League divisions
Little League
Intermediate League
Junior League

References

Australia
Baseball competitions in Australia